Kindle Magazine was an English-language national journal being published online from Kolkata, India, it was founded in 2008 by journalist Pritha Kejriwal (formerly of Hindustan Times and NDTV) and Kolkata-based CFA Maitreyi Kandoi. The journal placed special emphasis on long-form journalism focusing on socio-political and cultural issues.

In 2013,the Kindle Magazine received a Special Jury Award from The Laadli Media and Advertising Awards for Gender Sensitivity.

History 
The magazine was launched in 2008 by journalist Pritha Kejriwal and Maitreyi Kandoi, a chartered financial analyst. It ran uninterrupted till 2017. The last published volume was dated March 2017 and featured a cover story on the recently deceased John Berger.

Impact 
Noam Chomsky has said of Kindle, "The magazine has been a welcome regular source of lively and informative commentary and discussion." Shyam Benegal has praised it as "a refreshing change" in that it offers "perceptive, intelligent and thought-provoking articles on subjects ranging from politics to literature to history and humanities in general. The best part of the magazine is that it challenges… the prevailing mainstream culture." Humanitarian activist Binayak Sen has noted that "During this short period, Kindle has set up a trend of taking up interesting and relevant issues and of dealing with them in a radical and rigorous fashion." Actor Farooq Sheikh said he has "rarely seen a magazine with a more well deserved and swift upward graph in terms of quality and reader acceptance."

Content 
The special issues typically follow a theme or a cover story around which much of the content is organized, and usually features at least one in-depth interview with a prominent scholar or policy specialist on the cover story subject. The interviews have featured Shyam Benegal, Zoe Heller, Dibakar Banerjee, Mychael Danna, Edward Smith, Mallika Sarabhai, and Shobha De amongst others. Regular issues carry other interviews and opinion pieces, photo essays, and reviews of books, music, art or other cultural events. The magazine occasionally publishes poetry and short fiction. It also publishes separate editorial, informational and creative content online, along with articles from its print issues. The bulk of the content tends to be expository and analytic pieces.

Contributors 
Kindle Magazine publishes a number of regular columns, reported from Kolkata, Delhi, Chennai, Srinagar, Lahore, New York, London, Singapore, Tibet, Bangladesh, Africa and Latin America. Columnists include various authors and journalists like Oscar Guardiola Rivera, Azad Essa, Nitasha Kaul, Dibyesh Anand, Amit Sengupta, Saswat Pattanayak, Teresa Rehman, Anuradha Bhasin Jamwal, Debashree Dattaray, and Neel Adhikari. Other contributors include members of the editorial staff as well as frequent guest feature writers such as Adrian Levy, Paranjoy Guha Thakurta, Gulzar, Jeet Thayil, K. Satchidanandan, Annie Zaidi, Jose Varghese, Brinda Bose, Poornima Joshi, Tabish Khair, Sharanya Manivannan, Kiran Nagarkar, Prof. Marcus du Sautoy, Sarnath Banerjee, amongst others.

Events and community involvement 
Kindle Magazine has conducted 2 Roundtable conferences in the Kolkata Town Hall on IndoPak peace and sedition respectively, featuring Mani Shankar Aiyar, Farooq Sheikh, Tarun Tejpal, Aruna Roy, Dr. Binayak Sen, Anand Patwardhan, Abhishek Singhvi, Tarun Vijay, Suhel Seth, Taimur Rahman, and others. The magazine recently launched its first international documentary film festival titled Owlscope: X-rays of the Republic (5–8 April 2013) that showcased documentary screenings from around the world and were screened at theaters, bookstores, campuses and lounges across Kolkata. Kindle Magazine also conducts regular workshops with noted personalities on various subjects including, creative writing, theatre, debate etc.

Hiatus and possible end 
Kindle Magazine ran uninterrupted since publication, producing scholarly works that consistently received positive critical reviews.  However, editor and co-founder Pritha Kejriwal had noted the inherent financial difficulties involved in publishing such journals in the era when print media in general has struggled with progressively decaying revenue sources. While no explicit announcements were made by the publishers, the magazine has been inactive since early 2017. The latest available issue was published in March 2017. Given the impact of the pandemic on global economy, and the prolonged period of inactivity, Kindle Magazine's days of critical reflective journalism might just have seen their last sunset.

As of July 11, 2022, the official website Kindle Magazine was taken offline. No announcements were made, further suggesting that the magazine had shut its door for good. The website has since been reinstated, but no new content has appeared since 2017.

References

External links 

http://tollywoodhamaka.com/news/owlscope-a-novel-effort-to-kindle-change.html

2008 establishments in West Bengal
Cultural magazines
English-language magazines published in India
Monthly magazines published in India
Online magazines published in India
Magazines established in 2008
Mass media in Kolkata